Gagea lacaitae is a Mediterranean and Black Sea species of plants in the lily family. It is native to Spain incl. Balearic Islands, France incl. Corsica, Italy (Abruzzo + Sicily), Morocco, and Algeria.

Gagea lacaitae is a bulb-forming herb with yellow flowers.

The species is named for British botanist and politician Charles Carmichael Lacaita, 1853–1933.

References

External links
Flora de Aragón, Gagea lacaitae  in Spanish with color photo
Tela Botanica in French with color photos
Wast Magazine On-line, Guía de Plantas, Gagea lacaitae  in Spanish with color photo

lacaitae
Plants described in 1904